119th Street is one of four Metra railroad stations in Blue Island, Illinois along the Beverly Branch of the Rock Island District Line, and five within Blue Island generally. In Metra's zone-based fare system, 119th Street is in zone C. As of 2018, 119th Street is the 150th busiest of Metra's 236 non-downtown stations, with an average of 269 weekday boardings.

As of 2022, 119th Street is served by 20 trains in each direction on weekdays, by 10 inbound trains and 11 outbound trains on Saturdays, and by eight trains in each direction on Sundays.

Parking is available on the west side of the tracks south of 119th Street in front of the station house, and on both sides of the tracks north of 119th Street. On the northwest side, parking is available off South Hale Avenue, and on the northeast side along Vincennes Avenue. South of the station, the tracks cross Vincennes Avenue.

Bus connections
CTA
  119 Michigan/119th

References

External links

Station from 119th Street from Google Maps Street View
Station from Vincennes Avenue from Google Maps Street View

Metra stations in Illinois
Blue Island, Illinois
Railway stations in Cook County, Illinois